The Revolutionary Military Council in Idlib Governorate was a Syrian rebel military council affiliated with the Free Syrian Army and was headed by Colonel Afif Suleiman. The group was active in the Idlib Governorate.

History
Defected Syrian Air Force Colonel Afif Suleiman formed the Northern Shield Battalion in February 2012. In April 2012, Suleiman formed the Idlib Military Council. In late May 2012, the military council and its affiliated rebel groups, including the Syrian Martyrs' Brigade (then called the Martyrs of Mount Zawiya Battalion), terminated the Kofi Annan Syrian peace plan and began to launch attacks against Syrian Army positions near Idlib, in coordination with the allied Suqour al-Sham Brigade.

In December 2013, it issued a statement against the Islamic State of Iraq and the Levant to release all of its captured FSA officers, including Lieutenant Colonel Ahmed al-Saud of the 13th Division and Fares Bayoush of the Knights of Justice Brigade and their fighters.

The council joined the Syrian Revolutionaries Front on 9 December 2013.

On 14 June 2014, the commander of the Idlib Military Council, Col. Afif Suleiman, along with 8 other FSA military council commanders, all colonels or lieutenant colonels, resigned due to the lack of funding.

See also
List of armed groups in the Syrian Civil War
Damascus Military Council
Daraa Military Council
Quneitra Military Council

References

Anti-government factions of the Syrian civil war
Operations rooms of the Syrian civil war
Military units and formations established in 2012
Military units and formations disestablished in 2014
Anti-ISIL factions in Syria